Indomatie Goordial-John (born 9 August 1985) is a Guyanese former cricketer who played as a right-arm off break bowler. She appeared in one Test match and ten One Day Internationals for the West Indies between 2003 and 2005. In 2010, she appeared in 5 Twenty20 matches for the United States against Canada. She played domestic cricket for Guyana.

References

External links
 
 

1985 births
Living people
West Indies women One Day International cricketers
Guyanese women cricketers
West Indies women Test cricketers
Trinidad and Tobago cricket coaches
West Indian women cricketers
American women cricketers
Guyanese cricket coaches
21st-century American women